Hoole is a suburb in Cheshire, UK. It may also refer to:

Places
Hoole Village, civil parish in Cheshire, UK
Much Hoole, in South Ribble, Lancashire, UK
Little Hoole, civil parish in Lancashire, UK
Hoole railway station, defunct railway station in Little Hoole

People
see Hoole (surname)

Other
Hoole!, the sound sometimes made by pigs prior to toppling down in the game, Angry Birds
To Hoole (verb), to fail spectacularly in a situation in which success would normally have been expected.